The Central Coast Section (CCS) is the governing body of public and private high school athletics in the portion of California encompassing San Mateo County, Santa Clara County, Monterey County, San Benito County, Santa Cruz County and a few private schools in San Francisco. It is one of ten sections that comprise the California Interscholastic Federation (CIF).

Conferences and leagues
CCS comprises the following conferences and leagues:

Northern Conference
 Peninsula Athletic League (PAL)
 Private School Athletic League (PSAL)
 West Bay Athletic League (WBAL)

Central Conference
 Blossom Valley Athletic League (BVAL)
 Santa Clara Valley Athletic League (SCVAL)
 West Catholic Athletic League (WCAL)

Southern Conference
 Pacific Coast Athletic League (PCAL)
 Santa Cruz Coast Athletic League (SCCAL)

Sports offered
 Badminton
 Baseball
 Basketball
 Cross Country
 Field Hockey
 Football
 11-man football
 Golf, boys
 Golf, girls
 Gymnastics
 Lacrosse
 Soccer
 Softball
 Swim & Dive
 Tennis, boys
 Tennis, girls
 Track & Field
 Volleyball, boys
 Volleyball, girls
 Water Polo
 Wrestling

References